Macherla is a town in Palnadu district of the Indian state of Andhra Pradesh. It is the headquarters of Macherla mandal in Gurazala revenue division.

History 

Macherla is capital of the region Palnadu. The name Macherla originated from Mahadevi Cherla. This town is in the heart of Palnadu, and has a history of over a thousand years.  The famous battle Palnati Yudhdham (War of Palnadu) took place between Macherla and Gurazala between 1176 AD – 1182 AD. The Palnadu Battle is also called the Andhra Mahabharatam because of several similarities. The town is renowned for the Chennakesava Swamy temple built here during the reign of the Haihaya Kings. Palanati Brahmanaidu is from velama community and the minister to Haihaya kings, who tried to abolish the caste system by "Chapa Koodu" or "Sahapankthi Bhojanalu" in the 12th century.

Geography 
It has an average elevation of 136 metres (446 feet). It is located 23  kilometers from Nagarjuna Sagar. Jerri Vagu is the source of water for the town and the surrounding villages.

Demographics 
 census of India, the city had a population of 1,06,289. The average literacy rate stands at 71.13% with 86,176 literates, significantly higher than the state average of 67.41%.

Governance and politics

Civic administration 
Macherla Municipality is the civic body of the town and constituted in the year 1983.

Culture and tourism 

Nagarjunakonda Museum Nagarjunakonda, meaning the hill of Nagarjuna, was named after the Buddhist scholar and savant Acharya Nagarjuna. It was a great religious centre promoting Brahmanism and Buddhist faiths, moulding the early phases of art and architecture affiliated with them. The Ethipothala Falls lies 8 km from Macherla, is a mountain stream cascading down the hills as Chandravanka and Suryavanka streams. The Suryavanka falls from a height of 21 meters into a lagoon and joins River Krishna. The Sri Lakshmi Chennakesava swami temple hosts a yearly local festival, Tirunalla.

Transport 

Education 
As per the school information report for the academic year 2018–19, the village has a total of 21 schools. These include 1 MPP, 1 KGBV and 19 private schools.

See also 
Villages in Macherla mandal

References

External links 

Towns in Guntur district
Mandal headquarters in Guntur district